Charles Anthony Wolf (May 7, 1926 – November 26, 2022) was an American professional basketball coach. He coached two National Basketball Association (NBA) teams: the Cincinnati Royals from 1960 through 1963 and the Detroit Pistons from 1963 through 1964.

While living in Fort Thomas, Kentucky, Wolf graduated from St. Xavier High School in Cincinnati in 1944 and from Xavier University. He coached basketball at Villa Madonna College (now Thomas More University) before becoming an NBA coach.

Wolf died on November 26, 2022, at the age of 96. His grandson is professional tennis player J. J. Wolf.

References

External links 
 BasketballReference.com: Charles Wolf

1926 births
2022 deaths
American men's basketball coaches
American men's basketball players
Basketball coaches from Kentucky
Basketball players from Kentucky
Cincinnati Royals head coaches
College men's basketball head coaches in the United States
Detroit Pistons head coaches
Notre Dame Fighting Irish men's basketball players
People from Fort Thomas, Kentucky
Sportspeople from the Cincinnati metropolitan area
St. Xavier High School (Ohio) alumni
Thomas More Saints men's basketball coaches
Xavier University alumni